Sally Engelhard Pingree is an American philanthropist and a daughter of the industrialist Charles W. Engelhard Jr. and his wife, Jane (the former Marie Annette Reiss Mannheimer).   Pingree is a sister-in-law of fashion designer Oscar de la Renta.

She is a trustee of the Charles Engelhard Foundation and is known for her contributions to progressive environmental, social, and educational causes. She has also been a major political donor to Democratic Party causes, including that of her former sister-in-law Chellie Pingree.

Pingree serves on boards at Boston College, the Carter Center, National Geographic Society, and St. Andrew's School. She is a graduate of Trinity College.  She has two children and lives in Washington, D.C.

Pingree is divorced from Sumner Pingree III, whom she married in 1978.

References

American people of Brazilian descent
American people of German-Jewish descent
American philanthropists
Boston College people
Living people
Trinity College (Connecticut) alumni
Year of birth missing (living people)